Ayşegül Özbege is a Turkish freestyle wrestler competing in the 76 kg division. She is a member of Enkaspor.

Career 

In 2018, Aysegul Ozbege won a silver medal in the Senior U23 World Wrestling Championships in Romania.

She won the silver medal in the women's 76 kg event at the 2019 European U23 Wrestling Championship held in Novi Sad, Serbia.

In 2021, she won the silver medal in the women's 76 kg event at the European U23 Wrestling Championship held in Skopje, North Macedonia.

In 2022, she competed in the women's 76 kg event at the Yasar Dogu Tournament held in Istanbul, Turkey.

References

External links 
 

Living people
Turkish female sport wrestlers
Year of birth missing (living people)
European Games competitors for Turkey
Wrestlers at the 2019 European Games
21st-century Turkish sportswomen